X-Infernus is a four-issue comic book mini-series that started in December 2008. Written by C. B. Cebulski, with art by Giuseppe Camuncoli, it was a sequel to "Inferno". It sees the return of the character Magik searching Limbo for her soul.

Plot summary

Chapter One: Soul Survivors
Colossus is wondering why the X-Men are doing nothing to save Illyana from Limbo. Scott says they have tried and will keep trying, but Limbo is still sealed off. Amanda Sefton has been unable to break the seal, Doctor Strange is nowhere to be found, and Warren has scientists looking into it, but this is magic and there is nothing more they can do. Colossus says he cannot accept it.

While in Limbo, Magik attacks various other demons looking for her Soulsword and the original Bloodstone amulet. This does not go unnoticed by Mephisto, Blackheart, Satannish, Dormammu, and Hela. Belasco's daughter, Witchfire appears during the meeting and reveals that she is the current owner of the original amulet. She vows to take her father's place as ruler of Limbo and to kill Magik.

Back at the X-Men's base in San Francisco, Mercury and Rockslide are watching Kurt and Pixie train. Kurt brings up her Soul Dagger in conversation, which Megan is not pleased to hear about. Kurt points out that people have noticed that when she uses it, her personality changes. Pixie begins to cry and summons her Soul Dagger; her personality changes and she stabs Kurt in the chest, knocking him out. Mercury and Rockslide, who are watching the session, rush in and pull her away from Kurt. Beast enters and is shocked at what he finds. Pixie's Soul Dagger is stuck in Kurt's chest and when she removes it, she accidentally discovers where Magik's Soulsword is hidden, inside Nightcrawler. Sensing the Soulsword, Magik teleports into the X-Men's base to reclaim it.

Chapter Two: This Mortal Coil
Magik stands before Pixie, Mercury, Rockslide and Beast, demanding Pixie hand over her Soulsword. She takes out Mercury, Rockslide and Beast, and engages Pixie in combat. Pixie refuses to hand over the sword, but Magik overpowers her and regains her sword. As soon as she gets hold of it, her appearance changes and she becomes more human than demon. At that moment, Colossus, Armor, Karma, Wolverine, Cyclops, and Emma Frost enter. Magik strikes Colossus when he calls her 'Snowflake' but senses something is wrong when she doesn't feel anything. She teleports back to Limbo, telling her brother that he can't save her; she has to save herself. The X-Men gather the wounded, and Pixie attempts to go after Magik but Kurt stops her. Pixie breaks out in tears and apologizes for stabbing him.

In Limbo, Witchfire learns that Magik has left Limbo and assumes control. She stabs S'ym in the chest, seriously wounding him. Magik teleports in to find him chained to the throne. She asks what happened and he informs her that Belasco's daughter, Witchfire, has taken control in her absence. Illyana is shocked to hear Belasco had a daughter, and Witchfire steps out of the shadows and attacks Magik.

Peter says he is going after Illyana. The other X-Men have a way to get to Limbo (through Pixie). Scott agrees with him and puts together a team consisting of Colossus, Pixie, Wolverine, Mercury and Rockslide, with Kurt in charge due to Pixie and Pete's personal stake in the mission. Pixie then teleports them into Limbo only to find they are surrounded by many hostile demons.

Chapter Three: What You Wish For
Magik confronts Witchfire at her castle. Witchfire claims everything Belasco ever owned, including Magik's soul, and after a quick battle, Magik is taken down by Witchfire, who claims the second Bloodstone amulet. Witchfire stabs Magik in the chest, injuring her and knocking her out. Witchfire takes Pixie's Bloodstone and adds it to the original amulet, giving her four Bloodstones and a more demonic appearance.

Elsewhere in Limbo, Kurt, Mercury, Colossus, Rockslide, Pixie, and Wolverine are fighting their way through many demons. Pixie, Mercury, and Rockslide are horrified at how brutal the older X-Men are towards the demons. An octopus-type creature attacks Kurt until Pixie jumps in and kills it with her soul dagger. Colossus shatters Rockslide, who reforms from Limbo rock, and Wolverine is stabbed in the chest with a sword that sends him into a berserker rage and he kills all the demons that stand in their way. After Colossus removes the sword from Wolverine, they stumble upon Belasco's castle. After trying to decide how to get there, Pixie senses the darkness within her suddenly growing and she teleports off to the castle by herself.

After arriving at the castle, Pixie happens upon a mirror that shows herself transformed into a demon. Pixie freaks out and runs into the throne room where she finds Magik chained up and Witchfire. Witchfire grabs Pixie by the throat and forces her to become her new apprentice and begins forging a new Bloodstone from Pixie's soul.

Hearing the screams from the castle, Kurt teleports the X-Men into the throne room. Once there, Witchfire turns Colossus and Wolverine against Mercury and Rockslide. Kurt notices Illyana chained to a pillar. She asks him to stab her with the Pixie's soul dagger, as it is the only way to free her, and he is the only one to do it because he is attuned to magic. She apologizes and he stabs her. At that moment, Colossus punches Kurt and Witchfire finished making her fifth and final Bloodstone from a partially demonic Pixie.

Chapter Four: Soul's End
Kurt, discovering that Colossus' punch is far from lethal, slips past him and Wolverine to remove the Soul Dagger from Illyana, retrieving her Soulsword and using them both to free his teammates from their enchantment. He then sees Witchfire finish making the fifth Bloodstone out of Pixie's soul and slices off Witchfire's hand. But she brushes him away with a magic blast and re-grows a demonic 3-fingered hand while Kurt consoles Pixie and tells her to use the dagger to free Illyana because of their mutual connection. Witchfire uses the Bloodstones to summon the Elder Gods to her aid, but Illyana and her friends interrupt her summoning. While the X-Men battle the Elder Gods, Illyana fights Witchfire, who blasts her. But Illyana is sheathed inside Mercury's magic-resistant skin, and they slash Witchfire and strip her of the amulet containing the Bloodstones. Illyana and Pixie use their blades to smash the amulet, but Witchfire escapes the crumbling castle with four Bloodstones into the Elder Gods' dimension. Pixie is despondent over losing more of her soul and tries to attack Magik with her Soul Dagger, but the glowing stone in its blade indicates that the stolen piece of her soul is inside it. Pixie flies away in tears.

Illyana is upset that she failed to recover her soul and fears for her humanity. Kurt consoles her by telling her of his half-demonic parentage and how he has decided he has a soul regardless of that. Peter also tries to console his sister, but when he sees the horns still on her head, she fearfully teleports all of them back to the X-Men's compound and then tries to leave. Peter, her old friends from the New Mutants, and Cyclops finally convince her to stay.

Collected editions
The series has been collected into a single volume:

 X-Infernus (152 pages, July 2009)

References

External links
 
 
 X-Infernus: Setting the Stage With CB Cebulski, Newsarama, December 3, 2008